Armin Krugel is a Swiss nordic combined skier who competed in 1995. He won a bronze medal in the 4 x 5 km team event at the 1995 FIS Nordic World Ski Championships in Thunder Bay, Ontario.

Krugel's only individual victory came earlier that same year in Calgary in the 15 km individual.

External links 

Swiss male Nordic combined skiers
Living people
Year of birth missing (living people)
FIS Nordic World Ski Championships medalists in Nordic combined